Port Edward may refer to:

Port Edward, British Columbia, a district municipality in Canada
Port Edward, KwaZulu-Natal, a town in South Africa
Port Edward, China, the former name of the urban core of Weihai, Shandong, China

See also
Port Edwards, Wisconsin